The 2010 Formula BMW Pacific season was the seventh and final Formula BMW Pacific season. The championship began on 3 April in Sepang and finished on 21 November in Macau after fifteen races held at six meetings. The series was axed at the end of the season, in favour of a new Formula BMW Talent Cup starting in 2011. Motorsport Asia will continue to run a rebranded JK Racing Asia Series from 2011, without BMW support.

Singapore-licensed, British driver Richard Bradley won the championship for Eurasia Motorsport with two races in hand, after dominating for most of the season, winning seven races outright as well as an eighth by being the top finisher behind the guest drivers – Carlos Sainz Jr. and Daniil Kvyat took five overall victories between them but were ineligible for championship points – run by the EuroInternational team. He also took three other podium finishes en route to a 76-point championship-winning margin over his nearest rival, Meritus driver Óscar Andrés Tunjo. Tunjo finished the season runner-up despite failing to finish any of the final two races, but E-Rain Racing's Jordan Oon or Mofaz Racing's Calvin Wong could not capitalise on Tunjo's misfortune.

Tunjo, Oon and Wong all took overall victories in Singapore, Guangdong and Okayama respectively, but Tunjo's consistent finishing kept him ahead of Oon and Wong, who each added a class win to their overall wins. Bradley's team-mate Nabil Jeffri completed the top five in the championship, and their results along with Kotaro Sakurai and Duvashen Padayachee helped Eurasia claim the Teams' Championship. Other class victories were claimed by EuroInternational's Dustin Sofyan and James Birch of Motaworld Racing.

Teams and drivers
 All cars were BMW-engined Mygale FB02 chassis. Guest drivers in italics.

Race calendar and results
 Three rounds were confirmed via an announcement by the FIA on 18 December 2009. A provisional calendar was latterly released by the championship, before being confirmed with no further changes. Latterly, rounds scheduled for the Korea International Circuit were moved to Guangdong and Okayama due to delays in track construction.

 1 Pole position recorded by Daniil Kvyat, but he was ineligible to score the pole point.
 2 Pole position recorded by Carlos Sainz Jr., but he was ineligible to score the pole point.

Standings

Drivers' Championship
Points were awarded as follows:

Teams' Championship
Points were awarded on the same basis (excluding pole points) as the drivers' championship, but only to a team's first two cars at the end of the race. If a team was running just one car at a meeting, their points were doubled.

References

External links
 BMW-Motorsport.com
 Asian Festival Of Speed

Formula BMW seasons
Formula BMW Pacific season
2010 in Asian sport
BMW Pacific